Kotsopoulos is a Greek surname. Notable people with the surname include:

Chris Kotsopoulos (born 1958), Canadian ice hockey player
Jace Kotsopoulos (born 1997), Canadian soccer player
Konstantinos Kotsopoulos (born 1997), Greek footballer
Stavros Kotsopoulos, Greek warlord and revolutionary

Greek-language surnames